Gird may refer to:

Gird, India, region of the Madhya Pradesh state in central India
Gird, Iran, village in the East Azerbaijan Province, Iran
Gird (geometry), also known as the great rhombidodecahedron, a nonconvex uniform polyhedron, indexed as U73
GIRD (Group for the Study of Reactive Motion), former Soviet research bureau founded in 1931 to study various aspects of rocketry

See also
Gerd (disambiguation)
Gurd (disambiguation)